Balazote is a municipality in Albacete, Castile-La Mancha, Spain. It has a population of 2,412.

See also
Bicha of Balazote
Oretani

References

External links

Balazote

Municipalities of the Province of Albacete